The University of Arizona School of Information is a multidisciplinary academic department and professional school in the College of Social and Behavioral Sciences focusing on the many aspects of information organization, management, or use and its impact on individuals and society. A combination of the School of Information Resources & Library Science (SIRLS) and the School of Information: Science, Technology, and Arts (SISTA), this new department plays host to faculty and students engaged in research and education on facets of the information sciences.

As of March 2016, the School of Information has been invited to join the iSchools Organization, a collection of information schools.

Undergraduate programs 
The School of Information currently offers three undergraduate degrees.
 The Bachelor of Arts in Information Science & Arts program focuses on topics such as digital aesthetics, information representation and computational art culture. 
 The Bachelor of Arts in Information Science & e-Society program studies issues related to privacy, ethics, information manipulation and the impact of social media on daily life. 
 The Bachelor of Science in Information Science & Technology explores topics such as machine learning, natural language processing and artificial intelligence.
Undergraduate students currently work in or graduate to become professionals in the fields of information management, data analysis, social media marketing, web design, and public relations.

Graduate & Doctoral Programs 
In the Ph.D. and M.A. programs, as well as in the new M.S. in Information program, students prepare for a variety of settings to include museums, health contexts, for-profit business settings, community or organizational libraries, as well as context relative to defense and intelligence operations. 
 The Master of Arts in Library and Information Science program focuses on information organization, law, and culture, and is the only American Library Association (ALA) accredited degree program in the State of Arizona.
 The new Master of Science in Information program recruits and admits applicants from a variety of different backgrounds, including sciences and engineering, social sciences, arts and humanities. The focus of this interdisciplinary program includes computational social science, data science, machine learning, and information retrieval or text mining.
 The Ph.D. in Information prepares researchers for careers in which they conduct original research in academia, government, and industry.

Certificate Programs 

The School of Information offers graduate certificates for professionals with advanced degrees to update their knowledge and skills in: 
 Digital Information Management (known as "DigIn") (UA Online)
 Archival Studies (UA Online)
 Law Librarianship 
 Legal Information & Scholarly Communication
 Medical and Community Health Information (UA Online)

Knowledge River 
Knowledge River (KR) is an educational experience within the School of information that specializes in educating information professionals who have experience with and are committed to the information needs of Latino and Native American populations. KR also fosters understanding of library and information issues from the perspectives of Latino and Native Americans and advocates for culturally sensitive library and information services to these communities. Since its inception, this program has become the foremost graduate program for training librarians and information specialists with a concentration in Latino and Native American cultural issues. To date, over 170+ scholars have graduated from this program.

Student Clubs & Activities 
Active student library organizations at the School of Information include:
 Library Student Organization (LSO)
Progressive Librarians Guild (PLG)
 Special Libraries Association Student Chapter (SLA)
 Special Libraries Association Arizona Chapter (SLA)

See also 

 List of American Library Association accredited library schools

References

University of Arizona
American Library Association accredited library schools
Information schools